Trachelidae is a family of araneomorph spiders (more recently evolved spiders with inward-pointing chelicerae) first described by Eugène Simon in 1897 as a subfamily called "Tracheleae" ("Trachelinae" in modern terminology). The Trachelidae family, also known as "ground sac spiders", is within the group of spiders known as the RTA clade, which includes mostly wandering spiders that do not use webs. Spiders in the Trachelidae family are characterized as being 3-10mm long and having a red cephalothorax and a yellow/tan abdomen. They are commonly found indoors. It was placed in the family Clubionidae, then later in Corinnidae when the Clubionidae were split up. The first study that suggested Trachelidae should be considered its own family was done by Deeleman-reinhold in 2001 as part of an analysis of RTA Clade spiders. An analysis by Martín J. Ramírez in 2014 suggested that it was not closely related to other members of the Corinnidae, and was better treated as a separate family. It was then placed in the CTC clade of spiders, or the Claw Tuft Clasper clade, which is a group of spiders that have two tarsal claws with tufts of hair.

A major synapomorphy of Trachelidae is the reduction of leg spines. Other synapomorphies of the family include no scales, no epiandrous spigot, only one major ampullate gland in females, no median apophysis, and the secondary spermatheca are the same size as the primary. Currently, there are 271 known species across 20 genera.

Genera

, the World Spider Catalog accepts the following genera:

Afroceto Lyle & Haddad, 2010 – Africa
Capobula Haddad, Jin, Platnick & Booysen, 2021 – South Africa, Lesotho
Cetonana Strand, 1929 – Russia, Brazil
Fuchiba Haddad & Lyle, 2008 – Africa
Fuchibotulus Haddad & Lyle, 2008 – South Africa, Mozambique
Jocquestus Lyle & Haddad, 2018 – Africa
Meriola Banks, 1895 – South America, North America, Guatemala
Metatrachelas Bosselaers & Bosmans, 2010 – Algeria, Europe
Orthobula Simon, 1897 – Asia, Africa
Paccius Simon, 1898 – Madagascar, Seychelles
Paraceto Jin, Yin & Zhang, 2017 – China, Korea
Paratrachelas Kovblyuk & Nadolny, 2009 – Asia, Algeria, Europe
Patelloceto Lyle & Haddad, 2010 – Ethiopia
Planochelas Lyle & Haddad, 2009 – Ghana, Uganda, Ivory Coast
Poachelas Haddad & Lyle, 2008 – South Africa, Zimbabwe
Spinotrachelas Haddad, 2006 – South Africa
Thysanina Simon, 1910 – South Africa, Namibia, Tanzania
Trachelas L. Koch, 1872 – Asia, Central America, North America, Caribbean, Spain, South America, Africa
Trachelopachys Simon, 1897 – South America
Utivarachna Kishida, 1940 – Asia

References

 
Araneomorphae families